Mitchell Lee Hedberg (February 24, 1968 – March 30, 2005) was an American stand-up comedian known for his surreal humor and deadpan delivery. His comedy typically featured short, sometimes one-line jokes mixed with absurd elements and non sequiturs.

Hedberg's comedy and onstage persona gained him a cult following, with audience members sometimes shouting out the punchlines to his jokes before he could finish them.

Early life 
Hedberg was born on February 24, 1968, in Saint Paul, Minnesota, the son of Arne and Mary (née Schimscha, 1943–2012) Hedberg. He was of Finnish-Swedish (from his paternal grandparents), Czech, and German descent. Hedberg attended Harding High School in Saint Paul. He took little interest in school, and claimed he was barely eligible to graduate.

Career 
Hedberg began his stand-up career in Florida, and after a period of honing his skills, he moved to Seattle and began to tour. He soon appeared on MTV's Comikaze, followed by a 1996 appearance on the Late Show with David Letterman that brought him his big break. He won the 1997 grand prize at the Seattle Comedy Competition. The next year he appeared in an episode of Fox's series That '70s Show.

In 1999, he completed his own independent feature film, Los Enchiladas!, which he wrote, directed, produced, and starred in. He recorded three comedy albums: Strategic Grill Locations, Mitch All Together, and Do You Believe in Gosh?, the last released posthumously. He appeared at the Montreal Just for Laughs comedy festival in 1998, 2001, and 2004.

Concurrent with his rising fame in the entertainment industry, Hedberg appeared on Letterman nine more times, signed a half-million-dollar deal with Fox for a television sitcom, and was dubbed "the next Seinfeld" by Time magazine. George Carlin, Dave Chappelle, Mike Birbiglia, Norm MacDonald and Lewis Black were among his comedian fans.

Style 
Hedberg's standup comedy was distinguished by the unique manner of speech he adopted later in his career, his abrupt delivery, and his unusual stage presence. His material was based on wordplay, non sequiturs, paraprosdokians, and object observations. His act usually consisted equally of compact one- or two-liners and longer routines, often with each line as a punchline. Many of his jokes were inspired by everyday thoughts or situations.

Hedberg occasionally added disclaimers to the end of a joke if it was not sufficiently well received, frequently variations on "that joke's dumb, I'm aware of that." During recordings for CDs, he would often say that he would find a way to edit a failed gag to make it seem well-received, for example by "adding laughter" to a failed joke containing arithmetic. Following such a failure on Strategic Grill Locations, Hedberg suggested, "All right... that joke is going to be good because I'm going to take all the words out and add new words. That joke will be fixed."

Comedy Central Records released an album, Do You Believe in Gosh? on September 9, 2008, that contained material Hedberg recorded at The Improv in Ontario, California in January 2005. His wife, Lynn, wrote in the introduction that the performance had been in preparation for a year-end CD recording.

Personal life 
Hedberg was married to Canadian comedian Lynn Shawcroft from 1999 until his death in 2005.

Hedberg was a frequent recreational drug user, mentioning it in some of his jokes (e.g., "I used to do drugs. I still do, but I used to, too"). He was interviewed by Jonathan Davis in the December 2001 issue of Penthouse. In the interview, published three years before his death, he was asked, "If you could choose, how would you end your life?" He replied, "First, I'd want to get famous, and then I'd overdose. If I overdosed at this stage in my career, I would be lucky if it made the back pages." In May 2003, he was arrested in Austin, Texas, for heroin possession. On October 12, 2004, Hedberg sat in on the news with Robin Quivers on The Howard Stern Show. He appeared on the show again on March 17, 2005, this time with Quivers and Artie Lange present, and briefly discussed his drug use, saying: "Well, you know, I got the drugs under control now." Stern asked, "Do you? You know how to take them responsibly?" Hedberg replied, "Yeah, you know, just for the creative side of it."

Death 
On March 30, 2005, Hedberg was found dead in his room at The Westminster Hotel in Livingston, New Jersey. His death was formally announced on April 1, leading some fans to believe it was an April Fools' Day joke.

His death was initially believed to be the result of a congenital heart defect, but in December 2005, the New Jersey medical examiner's office reported that he died accidentally as the result of "multiple drug toxicity", including cocaine and heroin.

Hedberg's funeral was held at St. Ambrose Catholic Church in Woodbury, Minnesota.

Discography

Filmography

Television appearances

References

External links

 
 

1968 births
2005 deaths
People from Saint Paul, Minnesota
Comedians from Minnesota
American male comedians
American stand-up comedians
Cocaine-related deaths in New Jersey
Deaths by heroin overdose in the United States
American people of Finnish descent
American people of Czech descent
American people of German descent
20th-century American comedians
21st-century American comedians